Executive Order 14070, officially titled Continuing To Strengthen Americans' Access to Affordable, Quality Health Coverage, was signed on April 5, 2022 and is the 86th executive order signed by U.S. President Joe Biden. The telos of the order is to ensure that all Americans have access to affordable, high-quality health care.

Provisions 
The executive order highlights the American Rescue Plan Act's positive impact on access to coverage, including enhanced marketplace subsidies, options for states to extend postpartum Medicaid coverage, and new incentives for states to expand their Medicaid programs, among other policies, according to the administration. In the Build Back Better Act, Democrats in Congress planned to enhance or prolong several of these programs. However, momentum on Capitol Hill has slowed, and President Biden used the signing of the executive order to call on Congress to act. He particularly requested that Congress prolong the increased marketplace subsidies, fix the Medicaid coverage gap, and empower Medicare to negotiate prescription medication pricing.

In terms of broad policy, President Biden's new executive order reiterates his previous order's goals: to maintain and enhance Medicaid and the Affordable Care Act, as well as to make high-quality health care accessible and affordable to all Americans. The executive order cites statistics to show that there is still work to be done, particularly in states that have not expanded Medicaid, and underlines the need of addressing issues including underinsurance, medical debt, and patient enrollment in coverage that does not fit their requirements. Under the previous executive order, agencies should continue to assess current agency rules and make adjustments as needed.

In addition, the directive urges certain agencies, including those in charge of health care, to find methods to expand affordable coverage, enhance quality, strengthen benefits, and boost enrollment. President Biden wants the agencies to look into policies that will 1) make coverage options and plan selection more clear; 2) increase benefits and access to providers; 3) strengthen coverage for all consumers; and 4) make Medicaid, Medicare, and other government-sponsored programs more readily available and affordable; and 6) mitigating medical debt.

See also 
 List of executive actions by Joe Biden

References

External links 
 US Presidential Actions
 Federal Register
Executive Order on Ensuring a Lawful and Accurate Enumeration and Apportionment Pursuant to the Decennial Census

2022 in American law
Executive orders of Joe Biden
 April 2022 events in the United States